Yew Chung International School (YCIS), is a private international school in Hong Kong for boys and girls ages 6 months to 18 years (Infant & Toddler to Year 13). The campuses are situated in Kowloon Tong, and in Kowloon City District, and educate children from Kindergarten to Secondary. The school is operated by Yew Chung Education Foundation. At YCIS, they support learning through Chinese and English as well as French and Spanish (as additional language).

Origins and history 
Yew Chung was founded in 1932. Originally specializing in early childhood education, Yew Chung International School Hong Kong (YCIS) now provides international education from early childhood through primary school education and secondary school education. YCIS Hong Kong is part of a network of schools that includes Shanghai, Beijing, Chongqing, and Qingdao in China, and Silicon Valley in the United States. They now provide international education.

Quick facts 

 YCIS Hong Kong offers IGCSE, YCIS and IB curriculum based on the National Curriculum for England (NCE) with a bilingual focus on English and Chinese language acquisition.
 Students at YCIS Hong Kong learn to read, write, and speak fluent Mandarin Chinese through curricula tailored for both native and non-native speakers.
 Secondary School students at YCIS Hong Kong study IGCSE  and the IB Diploma Programme.
 YCIS Hong Kong curriculum in Years 1-3 includes professional violin lessons taught by highly trained, world class violinists aimed at both instilling a lifelong love of music as well as greater confidence onstage. The school has hired many of these musicians, such as Ms Bae. 
 YCIS Hong Kong offers a common Pre-IB course, identical to Year 11, for new students seeking to prepare for the IB Diploma Programmee.
 YCIS Hong Kong is registered as a non-profit organization,

Timeline 
 1932 - Yew Chung is founded.
 1990s - Primary and secondary schools officially open.
 1990s - YCIS pioneers the co-teaching method.
 2000 - YCIS Hong Kong becomes the first international school in Hong Kong to have IB graduates.
 2008 - YCIS Hong Kong joins the network to raise funds for the victims of Sichuan.
 2010 - Yew Chung's Director, Dr. Betty Chan, receives an Honorary Degree of Doctor of Humane Letters from the University of Illinois, US.
 2011 - YCIS launches network charity, Seeds of Hope.
 2015 - Yew Chung's Director, Dr. Betty Chan, receives an Honorary Degree of Doctor of Laws from the University of Bath, UK.
 2015 - YCIS Hong Kong Secondary is accredited by the Council of International Schools (CIS)

Notable alumni
Chu Ka Mong, fencer
William Chan, singer and actor

Accreditation and authorisation 
 Council of International Schools (CIS)
 International General Certificate of Secondary Education (IGCSE)
 International Baccalaureate Diploma Programme (IBDP)
 A member of Association of China and Mongolia International Schools (ACAMIS)

References

Network of schools 
 Yew Chung International School of Hong Kong
 Yew Chung International School of Beijing
 Yew Chung International School of Shanghai
 Yew Chung International School of Chongqing
 Yew Chung International School of Qingdao
 Yew Chung International School of Silicon Valley

External links 

 Yew Chung International School of Hong Kong

1932 establishments in Hong Kong
Educational institutions established in 1932
International schools in Hong Kong
International Baccalaureate schools in Hong Kong
Kowloon Tong